The 1932 Oregon State Beavers football team was an American football team that represented Oregon State University in the Pacific Coast Conference (PCC) during the 1932 college football season.  In their ninth and final season under head coach Paul J. Schissler, the Beavers compiled a 4–6 record (1–4 against PCC opponents), finished in eighth place in the PCC, and outscored their opponents, 130 to 109. Under coach Schissler, from 1925 to 1932, no team captains were elected. The team played its home games at Bell Field in Corvallis, Oregon.

On January 10, 1933, Paul Schissler resigned as Oregon State's football coach. The resignation followed a request by administrators for a reduction in his $8,000 per year salary. In nine years as Oregon State's head coach, Schissler compiled a 48–30–2 record.

Schedule

References

Oregon State
Oregon State Beavers football seasons
Oregon State Beavers football